Desert elephants or desert-adapted elephants are not a distinct species of elephant but are African bush elephants (Loxodonta africana) that have made their homes in the Namib and Sahara deserts in Africa.  At one time they were classified as a subspecies of the African bush elephant, but this is no longer the case. Desert-dwelling elephants were once more widespread in Africa than they are now and are currently found only in Namibia and Mali. They tend to migrate from one waterhole to another following traditional routes which depend on the seasonal availability of food and water. They face pressure from poaching and from changes in land use by humans.

Namibia
Elephants have traditionally lived in this area and in the earlier part of the 20th century there were about 3,000 in the Kunene Region. By the 1980s these had greatly diminished in number, however since then, conservation measures have been put in place and by 2013 the number of elephants had increased to about 600. In 1995–1996 there were good rains in Namibia and the elephants expanded their range southwards to the Ugab River.

The desert elephants were absent from the southern Kunene Region during the war for independence. They moved north for safety, returning to the Ugab River in the mid 1990s by which time many indigenous people had moved into the area following Namibia's independence. Many of these new residents had no experience of living with wild elephants.

In the Hoanib River area male elephants have tusks, but about a third of the female elephants there are tuskless. Adult bull desert elephants are usually solitary and roam over large areas. One was recorded as travelling between the Skeleton Coast National Park and the Etosha National Park in a few months. Other bulls have occasionally moved into the area from better-watered regions to the east. The family groups in which most desert elephants move are small and usually consist of a female elephant and her offspring or two sisters and their dependent young. They tend to stay near the ephemeral rivers where there is greater availability of food. They usually make the trek in a single night, when the temperature is cooler than by day. At certain times of year they move inland along narrow traditional paths to mountain areas in search of  myrrh bushes (Commiphora spp.) which seem to be a favourite foodstuff.

Mali
Rock art dating back to Neolithic times throughout the Sahara show that elephants were at that time widespread across much of North Africa. Nowadays they are restricted to the Gourma area, a remote region in Mali south of a loop made by the River Niger near Timbuktu. These elephants are the remnants of a number of groups which used to inhabit large areas of the Sahel as recently as 1970, before mostly being eliminated by poachers. The Malian population, which is believed to number about 400, makes a three hundred mile migratory journey each year, moving up to 35 miles a day. The elephants follow an anticlockwise route that takes them past temporary and permanent water holes. They remain in the northern parts of their range until the rains arrive in June. They then head southwards, moving briefly into northern Burkina Faso before moving northwards again. They are elusive and tend to seclude themselves among Acacia trees during the day, emerging to drink and feed at night.

The WILD Foundation and Save the Elephants are conservation charities that have been working with the Malian Government to conserve these elephants. Some animals were fitted with GPS collars to track their movements and identify corridors through which they need to traverse to complete their journey, so that their routes could be avoided when new human settlements were established. The nomadic Touareg people who live in this region with their herds have been tolerant of the elephants. They are philosophical, stating that the elephants eat the topmost foliage of a tree, the camels browse the sides and the goats browse near the base. They know when the elephants will pass through their villages, visiting the ponds they also use for watering their herds. Nowadays, these people are living more settled lives and building huts, tending gardens, planting orchards and growing fodder grass at the water's edge of ponds. This means there is more competition between the elephants and the humans. A local initiative was set up in 1997, "Les Amis des Elephants", which aims to inform villagers of when the elephants are expected to arrive in their area. It also encourages them to act as guides and generate income from eco-tourism. 

During a prolonged drought in 1983, the Malian Government trucked in water for the elephants. The rains failed again in 2008 and the following year the adult elephants were digging down to access water deep below the surface but the youngsters could not reach the water with their trunks and were dying. The charities did what they could but the weakened state of the animals made it difficult to help them.

Behaviour
These elephants have developed certain adaptations for desert life and tend to have relatively broader feet, longer legs and smaller bodies than other African bush elephants. They are herbivorous, and their diet varies with the time of year. They may walk up to 70 kilometers at night to find water points, which is the cause of their bigger feet. In the wet season they prefer buds and fresh green leaves but in the dry season they subsist on drought-tolerant plants such as the camelthorn (Acacia erioloba), myrrh bushes, the mopane or turpentine tree (Colophospermum mopane) and the leaves and seedpods of the ana tree (Faidherbia albida). They use water, mud or dust for bathing or coating their skin.

References

Desert fauna
desert
Fauna of the Sahara
Mammals of Namibia